The metre–tonne–second or MTS system of units is a system of physical units. It was invented in France, hence the unit names sthène and pièze, and became its legal system between 1919 and 1961 ("décret" 5 May 1961, "Journal Officiel"). It was adopted by the Soviet Union in 1933 and abolished there in 1955. It was a coherent metric system of units, much as SI and the centimetre–gram–second system (CGS), but with larger units for industrial use, whereas the CGS system was regarded as suitable for laboratory use only.

Units 
The base units of the MTS system are:
 Length: metre
 Mass: tonne,
 1 t = 103 kg = 1 Mg
 Time: second

Some common derived units:
 Volume: cubic metre or stere
 1 m3 ≡ 1 st
 Force: sthène,
 1 sn = 1 t⋅m/s2 = 103 N = 1 kN
 Energy: sthène-metre = kilojoule,
 1 sn⋅m = 1 t⋅m2/s2 = 103 J = 1 kJ 
 Power: sthène-metre per second = kilowatt,
 1 sn⋅m/s = 1 t⋅m2/s3 = 103 W = 1 kW
 Pressure: pièze,
 1 pz = 1 t/m⋅s2 = 103 Pa = 1 kPa = 1 cbar (centibar)

See also 

Foot–pound–second system of units (FPS)
 List of metric units
Metre–kilogram–second system of units (MKS)

References 

 
Systems of units
Metric system